The Wright Institute is a private graduate school focused on psychology and located in Berkeley, California.

History
The institute was founded by Nevitt Sanford in 1968 when he left Stanford. Dr. Sanford first gained prominence as a co-author of "The Authoritarian Personality," a study of anti-Semitism published in 1950. His co-authors included two refugees from Nazi persecution, Theodor Adorno and Else Frenkel-Brunswik.

Sanford believed strongly in the capacity of adults to continue to learn and grow throughout their lives. His developmental approach and emphasis on the possibilities of lifelong learning form a key part of the foundation on which the Wright's doctoral program is built.

Sanford was also influential in shaping American clinical psychology educational standards. In 1947, he was appointed by the American Psychological Association to the committee that established criteria for accrediting programs in clinical psychology. Under his leadership, the Wright Institute broadened the educational scope of clinical psychology training to include an emphasis on understanding the diverse society in which we live.

Academics
The Wright Institute has two programs: a doctoral program in clinical psychology leading to a Psy.D. degree; and a master's program in counseling psychology leading to an M.A. degree.

The institute is accredited by the Accrediting Commission for Senior Colleges and Universities of the Western Association of Schools and Colleges (WASC). The Doctor of Psychology (Psy.D.) in Clinical Psychology program is accredited by the American Psychological Association's Committee on Accreditation and the Master of Arts in Counseling Psychology program is approved by the Board of Behavioral Sciences (BBS). The MA program is designed to meet the requirements defined in the California Business and Professions (B&P) Code Sections 4980.37 and 4980.40 which cover the statutes and regulations relating to the practice of marriage and family therapy.

Notable alumni
Alan Briskin, M.A. and Ph.D. Organizational Psychology, 1984
Derek Draper, M.A. Psychology, 2004
Peter Gabel, Ph.D. Clinical Psychology, 1981
Jan Haaken, Ph.D. Social and Clinical Psychology, 1979 
Joseph E. Marshall, Ph.D. Clinical Psychology, 1997
Amalia Mesa-Bains, Ph.D. Clinical Psychology, 1983
Suzanne Segal

Notable former employees
Charles Hampden-Turner
Stephen Nachmanovitch

References

External links
 Official website

Universities and colleges in Alameda County, California
Schools accredited by the Western Association of Schools and Colleges
Educational institutions established in 1968
Education in Berkeley, California
Private universities and colleges in California